The Seattle Skating Club is a figure skating club and non-profit organization based in Mountlake Terrace, Washington.

Notable skaters from the club include 1983 World Champion Rosalynn Sumners and the pair skating teams of Karol and Peter Kennedy and Cynthia and Ronald Kauffman, who each won multiple titles at the U.S. Figure Skating Championships.

External links
 Seattle Skating Club web site

Figure skating clubs in the United States
Sports in Seattle